The 2019–20 Omaha Mavericks men's basketball team represented the University of Nebraska Omaha in the 2019–20 NCAA Division I men's basketball season. The Mavericks, led by 15th-year head coach Derrin Hansen, played their home games at Baxter Arena in Omaha, Nebraska as members of the Summit League. They finished the season 16–16, 9–7 in Summit League play to finish in a tie for fourth place. They lost in the quarterfinals of the Summit League tournament to Oral Roberts.

Previous season
The Mavericks finished the 2018–19 season 21–11 overall, 13–3 in Summit League play, to finish in 2nd place. In the Summit League tournament, they defeated North Dakota in the quarterfinals, Purdue Fort Wayne in the semifinals, advancing to the championship game, where they fell to North Dakota State.

Roster

Schedule and results

|-
!colspan=12 style=| Non-conference regular season

|-
!colspan=9 style=| Summit League regular season

|-
!colspan=12 style=| Summit League tournament
|-

|-

Source

References

Omaha Mavericks men's basketball seasons
Omaha Mavericks
Omaha Mavericks men's basketball
Omaha Mavericks men's basketball